Profundiconus stahlschmidti is a species of sea snail, a marine gastropod mollusc in the family Conidae, the cone snails and their allies.

Like all species within the genus Profundiconus, these cone snails are predatory and venomous. They are capable of "stinging" humans, therefore live ones should be handled carefully or not at all.

Description
The size of the shell varies between 10 mm and 26 mm.

Distribution
This marine species occurs off Togian Islands, Sulawesi, Indonesia.

References

 Tenorio M.J. & Tucker J.K. (2014) Description of a new Profundiconus from Togian Island, Sulawesi (Indonesia): Profundiconus stahlschmidti sp. nov. (Gastropoda, Conilithidae). Xenophora Taxonomy 2: 36–41

External links
 
  Puillandre N., Duda T.F., Meyer C., Olivera B.M. & Bouchet P. (2015). One, four or 100 genera? A new classification of the cone snails. Journal of Molluscan Studies. 81: 1–23

stahlschmidti
Gastropods described in 2014